Mankind is an album by American nu metal band Factory 81. Originally released in late 1999 via Medea Records, the album marked the band's debut on the Detroit independent music scene, and its 2000 reissue on Motown/Universal introduced the band to a national audience.

The album, which derives influence from hardcore punk, metal, jazz fusion and world music was the band's only album.

Production 
The album was self-produced by the band under the title Manking. A Detroit promoter sent out advertisements with the incorrect title Mankind instead. The band liked the sound of this title and decided that since they had not printed any materials with their original title, they changed the name of the album.

Music 
AllMusic described Mankind as a fusion of "stomp-paced metal" and "'new school' hardcore". Drummer Andy Cyrulnik cited genres such as jazz, fusion, and world music, and the progressive metal band Tool as influences on his drumming style.

Release history 
Mankind was originally issued on Medea Records in 1999. It was reissued by Orchard in 2000 and Uptown/Universal on October 3, 2000. In 2001, the album was reissued by the independent record label Mojo Music.

Reception
Blabbermouth.net's Borivoj Krgin gave the album a 5 out of 10. He praised its clean production, but criticized the album saying that the album is "a faceless, generic nu-metal band who possess neither the songwriting ability nor the ingenuity to compete with the big boys".

Track listing

Personnel
Factory 81:
Andy Cyrulnik - drums
Kevin Lewis - bass
Bill Schultz - guitar
Nathan Wallace - vocals, guitar

Production:
Robert Alford - Photography
Dan Dinsmore - Graphic Design, Layout Concept, Layout Design
Rhys Fulber - Remixing
Joe Gastwirt - Mastering
Tony Hamera - Engineer, Mixing, Producer
Victor Minetola - Engineer, Mixing, Producer
Mike Plotnikoff - Engineer
Adam Redner - Art Direction, Layout Concept, Layout Design

References

1999 debut albums
Factory 81 albums
Universal Records albums